Roseovarius azorensis is a Gram-negative, aerobic, non-spore-forming, rod-shaped and motile bacterium from the genus of Roseovarius which has been isolated from seawater from Espalamaca from the Azores.

References 

Rhodobacteraceae
Bacteria described in 2014